This is the preliminary round of the Copa Sudamericana 2008 tournament. The teams that have qualified for the preliminary round are the second-placed teams from each South American country, excluding Brazil and Argentina. A total of eight teams will play in two-legged matches. Four teams will proceed to the next round. Team 1 will play the first leg at home. The away goals rule will be employed in this round. The preliminary round was scheduled to be played between July 29 and August 21.

|}

Matches

First leg

Second leg

References

External links
CONMEBOL Official Confederation website 

Pre